A wringer is a mechanical laundry aid (also known as a mangle).

Wringer may also refer to:

 Wringer (magic trick), a stage magic trick
 Wringer (novel), a Newbery Honor–winning 1998 novel
 Wringer bucket, a device for squeezing out a wet mop
 "Stuck in the Wringer", a SpongeBob SquarePants (season 7) episode

See also 
 Ringer (disambiguation)